Humphrey John Stewart (22 May 1856 – 1932) was an American composer and organist, born in England.  A native of London, he came to the United States in 1886, and served for many years as a church organist on the West Coast. In 1898, he was awarded a doctorate degree in music from the University of the Pacific. In 1901, he gave a recital in Buffalo, New York and accepted a position at Trinity Church in Boston, but after two years he returned to San Francisco. In 1915, Stewart took a position as organist at the Panama-California Exposition in San Diego, and stayed in that city for many years, playing open-air organ concerts at Balboa Park.

Stewart was a founding member of the American Guild of Organists, and was an honorary lifetime member of the Bohemian Club. In the pages of The American Organist, Stewart wrote in March 1919 about what he called the "Messiah Fallacy", a critical analysis uncomplimentary to Handel's Messiah. Stewart described how the music of the Messiah was completely incompatible to the sacred nature of the text, except for the Hallelujah chorus, of which he was non-committal, preferring Beethoven's Hallelujah. A flurry of letters to the editor resulted, some critical of Stewart, some supportive of his stance.

Works
Among his works were an opera, two comic operas, three Grove Plays, incidental music for plays, some works for orchestra, choral music, and some songs and instrumental works; he also wrote church music.

1888 - The Nativity, oratorio (church)
1889 - Bluff King Hal, romantic opera
1890 - His Majesty, comic opera
1899 - I behold and lo! anthem
1900 - The Conspirators, comic opera
1903 - Montezuma, Grove Play
1906 - Scenes in California, orchestral suite
1906 - The Owl and Care, Grove Play, musical spectacle
1916 - Gold, Grove Play
1924 - The Hound of Heaven, a Musical Drama

References

External links
 

1856 births
1932 deaths
American male classical composers
American classical composers
American opera composers
Musicians from London
American classical organists
American male organists
Balboa Park (San Diego)
English emigrants to the United States
University of the Pacific (United States) alumni
Male classical organists